Pontiac station is an Amtrak train station in Pontiac, Livingston County, Illinois, United States. Pontiac station is served by the Illinois-focused Lincoln Service between Chicago Union Station and the Gateway Transportation Center in St. Louis, Missouri and the long-distance Texas Eagle between Chicago and Los Angeles Union Station. Until April 2007, Pontiac was also served by the Ann Rutledge, a train from Chicago to Kansas City Union Station. Pontiac station boasts a single, low-level side platform for trains, along with a station depot for passengers. The station also has a wheelchair lift and handicap-accessibility per the Americans with Disabilities Act of 1990. 

Pontiac originated as a stop on the Chicago and Alton Railroad. A station depot, built in 1901, formerly served as the Amtrak station until a new one was constructed to the south. A new station opened on June 5, 2017, at a cost of $2.65 million.  

An older depot, located one block north of the new station, was retired from service and became a pizza restaurant.

References

External links

Pontiac, IL – Texas Eagle (Amtrak)
Pontiac Amtrak Station (USA Rail Guide -- Train Web)

Amtrak stations in Illinois
Pontiac, Illinois
Transportation buildings and structures in Livingston County, Illinois
Railway stations in the United States opened in 2017